Im Hazman ("As Time Goes By") is the eleventh studio album by Israeli singer/songwriter rock artist Aviv Geffen, released in March 2006.

Track listing
"Im Hazman" (With The Time) – A Léo Ferré tribute – 3:46
"Machar" (Tomorrow) – 3:49
"Alfei Anashim" (Thousands of People) – 3:43
"Ze Rak Halev Shekoev Lach" (Only the Heart Hurts) – 3:51
"Magefa" (Epidemic) – 3:50
"Haolam Hatachton Shel Ha'ahava" (Underground of Love) – 3:50
"Zoharim" (Glowing) – 4:15
"Bishvilech" (For You) – 3:34
"At Hakelev Veani" (You, Me and the Dog) – 4:16
"En Zman Tachat Hashemesh" (No Time Under the Sun) – 3:44

Note
3, 5 and 7 also recorded in English versions by Blackfield, as 1,000 People, Epidemic and Glow respectively.

Personnel
Aviv Geffen – vocals, guitar, piano, keyboards, mellotron, drums, tambourine.

The Mistakes
Daniel Salomon – piano, keyboards, piano rhodes, vocals.
Harel Ben Ami – electric guitar, acoustic guitar.
Tomer Zidkiahu – drums, tambourine.
Shlomi Zidki – bass.

Guests
Ofer Meiri – keyboards, programming, vocals.
Gil Sorin – vibraphone.
Eli Magen – contrabass.
Steven Wilson – vocals.
Dana Adini – vocals.
Moshe Levi – vocals.
Downtown Session Orchestra – string instruments.

External links
 "As Time Goes By" at Burning Shed

2006 albums